The Champagne and Aishihik First Nations (CAFN) is a First Nation band government in Yukon, Canada. Historically its original population centres were Champagne (home of the Kwächä̀l kwächʼǟn - "Champagne people/band") and Aishihik (home of the Äshèyi kwächʼǟn - ″Aishihik people/band″), with bands active in both coastal and interior areas.

Most of its citizens have moved to Haines Junction to take advantage of services offered there, such as schools. The First Nation government has its main administrative offices there. Other settlements used included Klukshu. Many also live in Whitehorse where the First Nation government has offices. The language originally spoken by the Champagne and Aishihik people was Southern Tutchone.

The Champagne and Aishihik First Nations was one of the first four First Nations to sign a land claims agreement in 1992. The First Nation is also pursuing a land claim in its traditional territory in the northwestern corner of British Columbia.

History
In 1999, the mummified remains of a man were found by a group of hunters in a glacier in Tatshenshini-Alsek Park in British Columbia, Canada. Radiocarbon dating of artifacts found with the body placed its age at between 300 and 550 years.  Researchers contacted Champagne and Aishihik First Nations about the find before making any announcement. Their representatives visited the site and named the body as Kwäday Dän Ts'ìnchi, "Long Ago Man Found" in their language of Southern Tutchone.

DNA and other scientific testing was done with the agreement of the First Nations representatives. In 2007, mitochondrial DNA testing of 241 area volunteers of the Champagne and Aishihik First Nations revealed 17 living persons who are related to Kwäday Dän Ts'ìnchi through their direct maternal line. Among them were Sheila Clark and Pearl Callaghan, two of seven sisters. Clark said of the findings, "It was extremely moving. I couldn't believe it."

Fifteen of the 17 related individuals identify as Wolf clan, suggesting the man may also have belonged to the Wolf clan. In the matrilineal kinship system, children are considered born into their mother's clan and descent is figured by the mother's line. The individuals were split roughly in half between those who lived in coastal areas and those who lived inland, reflecting historic territories of bands.
As arranged by the Champagne and Aishihik First Nations, after the tests they had the remains of the man cremated and buried with ceremony near where they were found in Tatshenshini-Alsek Park.

Demographics 

References

External links
Champagne and Aishihik First Nations web site
Champagne and Aishihik First Nation profile, Government of Canada's Department of Aboriginal Affairs and Northern Development

First Nations in Yukon
First Nations governments in Yukon
Southern Tutchone